Emma Hart may refer to:

 Emma, Lady Hamilton (1765–1815), English model and actress
 Emma Hart (artist) (born 1974), English mixed medium artist
 Emma Hart (computer scientist) (born 1967), English academic who works with computational intelligence